Dorysthenes walkeri is a species of longhorn beetles in the subfamily Prioninae. Records of occurrence are from Iran to Indo-China.

References

External links 
 

Prioninae
Insects of Asia